Charles Barter (1821 – 15 July 1859) was a Scottish gardener and botanist who trained at Kew Gardens in London from 1849 to 1851. He was foreman of Regent's Park of the Royal Botanic Society from 1851 to 1857.

In 1857, he joined an expedition to Niger led by William Balfour Baikie (1825–1864), a naturalist and philologist from Scotland, who was in correspondence  with Charles Darwin. The expedition ended prematurely when the ship hit rocks near Jebba. It took one year for the survivors to be rescued and taken back to England but Charles Barter never returned to his country. He caught dysentery and died in Rabba, Nigeria in 1859.

Plants of the genus Barteria Hook. f. in the Passifloraceae commemorate his name.

References

British botanists
1859 deaths
1820 births
British expatriates in Nigeria
People from colonial Nigeria
Infectious disease deaths in Nigeria
Deaths from dysentery